Rūta Skujiņa (28 May 1907 – 16 April 1964) was a Latvian poet. She was the sister of Austra Skujiņa.

Bibliography
"Kuģi" (1935)
"Zvaigžņu bērni" (1937)
"Putni" (1947)
"Vējš svaida kaijas" (1964)

References

1907 births
1964 deaths
People from Limbaži Municipality
People from the Governorate of Livonia
Latvian World War II refugees
Latvian emigrants to the United States
Latvian women poets
20th-century Latvian poets